Urquidi is a surname. Notable people with the surname include:

José Urquidy (born 1995), Mexican baseball player
Juan Francisco Urquidi (1881–1938), Mexican politician and diplomat
Víctor Urquidi (1919–2004), Mexican economist 

Spanish-language surnames